Atuq Wachana (Quechua atuq fox, wacha birth, to give birth, -na a suffix, 'where the fox is born', also spelled Atoj Huachana) is a mountain in the Bolivian Andes which reaches a height of approximately . It is located in the Cochabamba Department, at the border of the Quillacollo Province, Sipe Sipe Municipality, and the Tapacarí Province. Atuq Wachana lies southeast of Pichaqani.

References 

Mountains of Cochabamba Department